Paika is a small town  from Palai on the Pala-Ponkunnam road of Muvattupuzha - Punalur SH:08, in Kottayam district, Kerala, India. It is part of Meenachil Taluka, known as one of the most fertile agricultural regions of Travancore. The town is well connected to the plantation towns of Kanjirapally, Erattupetta and Ponkunnam. The majority of residents are Syrian Malabar Nasrani Catholic Christians continuing their traditions from the times of Saint Thomas, an apostle of Jesus Christ. This region is part of the mid-lands (adjacent to the high ranges) of south-eastern Kerala. The main income is from agriculture, mostly rubber plantations.

Demographics
Many Syrian Catholic families of Kerala have origins around Meenachil that includes places like Pala, Paika, Edamattom, Bharananganam, Kuruvinal, Poovarany, Vilakkumadom, Thidanadu, Pinnakkanadu, Chettuthodu, Chengalam. The region is also credited to be the earliest place to experience agrarian expansion, initiated by a few Nasrani families of the region, as early as the 1840s. This trend of expansion later spread to other places in and around Meenachil and Kanjirapally Taluks. These expansions brought about major changes in the social and economic scene of Central Travancore.

Economy
Most of the Syrian Catholic families here are rubber estate owners. The Sabarimala Pilgrimage route passes through Paika. The 'Jubilee feast' of the shrine of Our Lady (St. Mary's shrine Paika is conducted during the second week of December. It attracts thousands of believers every year to this hamlet. Miles of colourful decorations along the pathways and  processions led by traditional orchestra during the feast provide cynosure to the eyes. Bible Tableau and Two Wheeler Fancy Dress competitions are conducted in association with Jubilee Thirunal. Cultural programmes led by major troupes and play back singers in association with Jubilee celebrations also attract thousands of people.
Inner Paika also has large tracts of rubber plantations owned by private families. The main income and prosperity of Paika is from the rubber plantations.

History and Etymology
The elders are of the opinion that the former name of Paika was Kottachery (kotta=basket; chery=place where people gather), and it was a thriving market in the past. The name Paika originated from "poika" meaning a small river, which runs on the side of Paika.

References 

Villages in Kottayam district